The 1991–92 Midland Football Combination season was the 55th in the history of Midland Football Combination, a football competition in England.

Premier Division

The Premier Division featured 17 clubs which competed in the division last season, along with four new clubs:
Alcester Town, promoted from Division One
Armitage 90, joined from the Staffordshire Senior Football League
Barlestone St. Giles, joined from the Leicestershire Senior League
Pershore Town, promoted from Division One

League table

References

1991–92
8